Reciprocation may refer to:

 Reciprocating motion, a type of oscillatory motion, as in the action of a reciprocating saw
 Reciprocation (geometry), an operation with circles that involves transforming each point in plane into its polar line and each line in the plane into its pole
 Reciprocation, application of the reciprocal function, see multiplicative inverse

See also

 Reciprocity (disambiguation)
 Reciprocal (disambiguation)